Sir William Askew (also spelled Ascough or Ainscough or Ascue; 1490–1540 or 1541) was a gentleman at the court of Henry VIII of England. He has gone down in history as one of the jurors in the trial of Anne Boleyn and as the father of Anne Askew, one of only two women to be tortured at the Tower of London, alongside Margaret Cheyne.

He was born the eldest son of Sir William Askew of Stallingborough, Lincolnshire, who he succeeded in 1510.

He was knighted at Tournai in 1513 when serving on the French campaign and in 1520 accompanied King Henry VIII, together with other knights, to the famous meeting with King Francis I of France at the Field of the Cloth of Gold.

He was a Member of the Parliament of England in 1529 for Great Grimsby.

He married three times; firstly by 1508, Elizabeth, the daughter of Thomas Wrottesley of Wrottesley, Staffordshire, with whom he had 2 sons and 3 daughters, secondly the daughter of a Struxley or Streichley of Nottinghamshire and thirdly in 1522, Elizabeth, the daughter of John Hutton of Tudhoe, co. Durham and the widow of Sir William Hansard of South Kelsey, Lincolnshire, with whom he had 2 further sons.

He was described as a welcome guest in Mary's household in 1536, indicating that he was a religious conservative. He is said to have physically forced his daughter, Anne Askew, to marry Thomas Kyme. Her repudiation of this marriage and her disbelief in the doctrine of transubstantiation led to her torture and execution, burnt at the stake in 1546. Her accusers attempted to implicate influential women at court as sharing Anne's beliefs, including the queen, Catherine Parr.

William Askew died in 1541, five years before his daughter's execution. He was buried at Stallingborough.

References

Members of the Parliament of England for Great Grimsby
1490 births
1541 deaths
English MPs 1529–1536